Elizabeth-Jane Burnett (born 1980) is a poet and academic, and is currently Lecturer in Creative Writing at Newman University in Birmingham, Associate Professor at Northumbria University, and a Leverhulme Research Fellow for 2021-22. She has described herself as an 'ecopoet' who curates 'ecopoetic' exhibitions. She is interested in nature writing, as well as place and family heritage.

Early life and education 
Burnett was born in Devon. Her mother is Kenyan while her father was born to a farming family in Ide, Devon. She studied English at Oxford, after which she attended Royal Holloway, University of London, to study for an MA and PhD in Contemporary Poetics.

Burnett also studied performance at the Bowery Poetry Club in New York and Naropa.

Publications 
Burnett has published two poetry collections with Penned in the Margins, 'Swims' and 'Of Sea'. Both books are concerned with the environment and activism, and Burnett is interested in how 'poetry can raise consciousness by bringing the effects of climate change or pollution to life'. 'Swims' documents experiences of wild swimming across the England and Wales, was featured as a Sunday Times Poetry Book of the Year in 2017.

Her poetry features in the anthologies Dear World and Everyone In It: New Poetry in the UK (Bloodaxe, 2013) and Out of Everywhere 2: Linguistically Innovative Poetry by Women in North America and the UK (Reality Street, 2015). Wasafiri 106: the Water issue (2021), features three poems by Burnett.

Her PhD thesis was published as A Social Biography of Contemporary Innovative Poetry Communities: The Gift, the Wager, and Poethics (2017) by Palgrave Macmillan.

The Grassling, A Geological Memoir (2019) was a winner of the Penguin Random House WriteNow award.

She published 'Rivering', a pamphlet of poems, with Oystercatcher Press in 2019.

In 2021, Burnett was commissioned by the National Trust to create a poem responding to nature observations made by members of the public.

References 

1980 births
Living people
Writers from Devon
People associated with Newman University, Birmingham
20th-century English poets
21st-century English poets